The Sino-German Center for Research Promotion (SGC) is a research funding institution based in Beijing, established by the German Research Foundation and the National Natural Science Foundation of China (NSFC).

The NSFC is the most important institution in China for the funding of basic research in the natural sciences, life sciences, engineering sciences and management sciences. The DFG is the central self-governing research funding organisation in Germany. It serves all branches of science and the humanities by funding research projects at universities and other public research institutions. Both organisations aim to deepen and expand mutual scientific relations. The first cooperation agreement was signed in 1988.

The SGC is tasked with promoting scientific cooperation between Germany and China with a focus on the natural sciences, life sciences, engineering sciences and management sciences. Its budget (in 2021: RMB 68.4 million or approximately 8,8 million euros) is used to support a range of funding programmes tailored to this purpose. In addition, the Center serves as an information platform, works to improve the infrastructure framework for scientific cooperation between Germany and China, facilitates the exchange of information about the research system in each country, and provides bilateral early career support. In this way it makes an important contribution to long-term cooperation between universities, research institutions and researchers in both countries.

History
The initiative of the NSFC and the DFG to found a jointly run center originated with a Chinese proposal in 1994. The idea was to create an institution to intensify scientific exchange between Germany and China.

The decision to establish such a project was formalised in 1995, when the founding agreement for the SGC was signed in the presence of Federal Chancellor Helmut Kohl and Chinese Premier Li Peng. In 1998 the agreement was signed by the DFG and NSFC, allowing the SGC to become reality. The foundation stone was laid in the same year. On 19 October 2000 the new building was opened and the SGC went into operation.

Organization
The SGC is an independent legal entity under Chinese law. Its legal representative is the NSFC's vice president for foreign affairs. The guidelines for the SGC's activities are laid down by a joint committee of four Chinese and four German members appointed by the NSFC and the DFG respectively. The Joint Committee convenes once a year. It appoints the directors and vice directors of the center, consults on and approves its work programme, and receives the annual report and annual accounts.

The work of the center is managed by the internal board and the SGC handles research proposals in cooperation with the DFG and the NSFC. The German side of the SGC also represents the DFG as a local point of contact in China for individual researchers and various partner organisations.

Funding programmes
To achieve its aims the SGC currently offers the following funding instruments:
 Scientific workshops/symposia for Chinese and German researchers in a defined working area 
 Research stays after participation in symposia
 Funding of mobility and exchange of German and Chinese researchers for up to three years (Mobility-Program)
 Preparatory visits
 Summer schools 
 Opportunity for junior research group leaders in Germany to visit China 
 Early career forums 
 Lindau Programme for participation in the Nobel Laureate Meeting

Location
The SGC building is located next to the NSFC in Haidian District in northwestern Beijing. It is near Tsinghua University and Beijing University. Situated between the fourth and fifth ring roads, the SGC is also linked to the metro (line 15; station Qinghuadongluxikou).

Other German research funding organisations in Beijing
 Fraunhofer-Gesellschaft 
 German Academic Exchange Service 
 Helmholtz Association of German Research Centres

References

External links
 Sino-German Center for Research Promotion
 DFG
 NSFC

Science and technology in China
China–Germany relations